George Frazier (1911–1974) was an American journalist. 

George Frazier may also refer to:

George Frazier (pitcher) (born 1954), baseball pitcher
George Frazier (manager) (1861–1913), baseball manager

See also
George Fraser (disambiguation)